North Georgia Technical College (NGTC) is a public technical college in Clarkesville, Georgia, with additional campuses in Toccoa (called the Currahee campus after nearby Currahee Mountain) and Blairsville. It is part of the Technical College System of Georgia. The college serves Habersham, Stephens, Union, Fannin, White, Rabun, Towns, and Franklin counties.

NGTC is accredited by the Commission on Colleges of the Southern Association of Colleges and Schools to award associate degrees; it is also accredited by the Commission of the Council on Occupational Education.

History

North Georgia Technical College's Clarkesville Campus originally was the home of the Georgia Ninth District School of Agriculture and Mechanical Arts (The A&M), which was active from 1907 until 1933. From 1938 to 1943, the campus was home of "Habersham College" and the National Youth Administration, one of President Franklin Delano Roosevelt's programs during the Great Depression.

Recognizing the need for occupational training for Georgians, the Georgia General Assembly created a vocational division in the State Board of Education, which approved a plan creating a system of state vocational schools in October 1943. The initial location for North Georgia Trade and Vocational School was chosen in 1943, and the school accepted its first student in February 1944.

As the demand for technical training grew, more courses were added. In 1962, the name of the school was changed to North Georgia Technical and Vocational School. On July 1, 1985, North Georgia Tech was placed under the governance of the new state board, which today is called the Technical College System of Georgia. In 1987, the name was changed to North Georgia Technical Institute.

The Clarkesville Campus of North Georgia Technical College is located in a mountain setting off Georgia Highway 197 one and one-half miles north of Clarkesville, the county seat of Habersham County. It is situated on 339 acres with the campus covering approximately 40 acres. It is 30 miles northeast of Gainesville, 50 miles north of Athens, Georgia, and 90 miles northeast of Atlanta off Interstate 85, Interstate 985 and Georgia Highway 365.

As part of former Governor Zell Miller's pledge to bring a post-secondary institution within 40 miles of every Georgian, the 1995 legislative session appropriated 5.5 million dollars to build a state-of-the-art facility to be located on 25 acres along the Zell Miller Mountain Parkway just outside the town of Blairsville. Union County graciously donated the land on which the Blairsville Campus is located. The 45,000+ square foot facility was built on a knoll with a dramatic view of the beautiful Blue Ridge Mountains. Classes began September 30, 1998, for the Blairsville Campus of North Georgia Technical Institute.

On July 1, 2000, House Bill 1187 was made into law. This paved the way for Georgia's technical institutes to become technical colleges. North Georgia Technical Institute became North Georgia Technical College on October 10, 2000.

Athletics

For a period of time beginning in 2011, NGTC competed in intercollegiate cross country as a member of the National Junior College Athletic Association and the Georgia Collegiate Athletic Association.  However, as of 2016 the official athletics page no longer discusses intercollegiate competition, and the GCAA does not include NGTC in its membership list.

References

External links
Official website
New Georgia Encyclopedia

Education in Habersham County, Georgia
Education in Union County, Georgia
Education in Stephens County, Georgia
Buildings and structures in Union County, Georgia
Buildings and structures in Habersham County, Georgia
Buildings and structures in Stephens County, Georgia
Education in White County, Georgia
Education in Rabun County, Georgia
Education in Fannin County, Georgia
Universities and colleges accredited by the Southern Association of Colleges and Schools
Technical College System of Georgia